La Broquerie is a local urban district in the Rural Municipality of La Broquerie, Manitoba, Canada. It is a predominantly Francophone community located approximately 10 kilometres east of Steinbach, Manitoba and 70 kilometres southeast of the provincial capital Winnipeg, at the confluence of Highways 52, 210, and 302.

For most of the community’s history, La Broquerie has been ranked as Manitoba’s largest dairy producer. A distinctive display at the south entrance to the community features a moderately sized, decorative cow.

The area's geography makes it attractive to winter sports. One can snowmobile and cross-country ski along the nature trails in the town as well as throughout the entire Sandilands Provincial Forest area. The community also has a golf course, La Verendrye Golf, named after the family of 18th century explorers. The St. Joachim Museum contains historic artifacts pertaining to the history of the French and Belgian settlers since 1877.

Demographics 

Sports 
Hockey is a huge part of life in La Broquerie and has been for 60 years. In the early 1950s, local residents spent months cutting and logging wood for the building of a new arena. The arena was built by hand with the help of countless local volunteers. Over the years, the arena burnt down on three occasions, and on all three occasions, local residents lobbied local businessmen and different levels of government to rebuild it. The volunteer board that has been overseeing the entire hockey program for 60 years is the Club Sportif.
Le Club Sportif, the body which oversees the hockey program in the community, is a model of organization to be envied. 

The local hockey team is known as the "Habs".  This year, every age level has at least one Habs team, and some have two, starting with the Timbits (age 4-6) all the way to the Senior Habs, who play hockey in the Carillon Senior Hockey League.

The Senior Habs have won five league championships in the past ten years. In 2006-2007, the Habs finished in first place in the league standings, sweeping the league championship finals, and winning the Provincial Senior "A" hockey championship.

History 
La Broquerie's history is well documented through the La Broquerie Historical Trail; a series of 15 interpretive signs that share the history of the community.  QR codes lead the visitor to exclusive anecdotes shared by local ambassadors.

There is also a Parish centennial that was produced to commemorate the St-Joachim Catholic Parish's centennial, celebrated in 1984.

Notable people 
 Mélanie Rocan, Painter
 Daniel Tetrault, hockey player
 Albert Vielfaure, politician

References 

Designated places in Manitoba
Local urban districts in Manitoba
Unincorporated communities in Eastman Region, Manitoba
Manitoba communities with majority francophone populations